Eric Krieger (born 6 March 1975) is an Austrian judoka who reached the quarter-final at the 1996 Olympic Games.

Eric currently attends the University of St. Thomas in St. Paul, Minnesota.

Achievements

References

1975 births
Living people
Austrian male judoka
Sportspeople from Vienna
Judoka at the 1996 Summer Olympics
Olympic judoka of Austria
20th-century Austrian people

External Links